Elizabeth de Portzamparc is a French-Brazilian architect.

Biography 
Born in Rio de Janeiro, Elizabeth de Portzamparc developed a very early passion for art. While she was still a child, her father, who was from Belo Horizonte and was passionate about architecture, regularly took her to Pampulha and talked to her about the "genius Oscar Niemeyer," who he knew and admired. Motivated by Iberê Camargo, a friend of her parents, Elizabeth started to practice conceptual art in her youth. She studied in the schools Sacred Heart of Jesus, Santa Ursula, Brasileiro de Almeida, and then passed the "vestibular" exams and entered the PUC (Pontifical Catholic University) faculty in Rio, which she had to abandon very soon because of the urge to leave the country.

Later on, in France, simultaneously to her studies in anthropology, urban sociology (Paris V), and regional planning (IEDES-Paris I), she dedicated herself exclusively to urban themes: new towns, IAURIF, and particularly to the urbanism workshop of Antony. There, in 77/78, she set pioneer studies on the concepts of "neighborhoods/sub-neighborhoods", bringing the notions of "local life" and territorial links to the center of the founding principles of territorial planning policies.

In 1980 she obtains the ability to teach in French architecture schools and teaches in the Ecole Nationale Supérieure d’Architecture of Paris-Val de Seine (UP9) between 1984 and 1988.

In 1982, she works on a research named Extension de la Démocratie Locale for the French Ministry of Environment and Quality of life.

In 1984, she carries an operational research for the French Ministry of the Equipment, by creating the first inter-communal urbanism structure for the project of the South Paris "Coulée verte". This research was later developed and completed by the IAURIF (called IAU nowadays).

In 1986, she opens and manages the Mostra gallery in Paris. Surrounded by artists, designers and architects such as Jean Nouvel, Rem Koolhaas, Christian de Portzamparc, François Rouan, Pierre Buraglio, Arata Isozaki, Bernar Venet and Peter Klasen, among others, she questioned the creative approach proper to architects, artists and contemporary furniture designers of that time. Consequently, through themed exhibitions, she developed a profusion of unique ideas showing very clearly the specificities of each creative field, which brought her to the headlines of many French and international magazines and put her gallery on the podium of the best Parisian galleries.

In 1985 she designed the "24 hours" desk, which was exposed at the Decorator Artist's Fair and at the Cartier Foundation during the exhibition called MDF, des créateurs pour un matériau (MDF, creators for a material - free translation). It witnessed great success and was then acquired by the Fonds National d'Art Contemporain.

In 1987 she created her own architecture agency, which is since then characterized by many projects touching different levels of development.

Career 
In 1989 she won the contest for the creation of the Information Center of the French National Assembly, and in 1992 she won the contest for the museography project of the Korean National Museum, to which she created a museographic urban path, based on a circuit of interior streets that extend the exterior public spaces, going through the exhibition rooms. The rooms have big overtures, like window displays facing these interior streets and making it very alive, animated, and unquestionably bringing quality to the museum visitation.

In 1995 she created the museography for the Museum of Brittany, in Rennes, for which she also designed a library, interior open squares and spaces for kids. This project brought consecration to Elizabeth de Portzamparc's style: through each one of her projects, her experience makes sense. She gets inspiration from the urban morphology to create interior "urban spaces" that host the different historical cycles. The scenographies of the first sequences are installed in spaces that remind buildings and public squares; the following ones are organized in spaces organized as a street, and those of the two great wars are presented in a tunnel, a more dramatic space that reminds the darkness of this period of our history. The ongoing contemporary time is installed in an open, interactive and scalable forum.

One of the rare women in architecture to win great international contests, Elizabeth won in 1997 the contest for the project of stations and urban furniture designed for the Bordeaux metropolitan tramway network. She created the stations as public squares in the city, very accessible and appropriable, based on the ideas of transparency, lightering and velocity, but most of all aiming the creation of a metropolitan identity. A unique collection of urban furniture, arranged to reveal the proper features of each one of the places crossed by the tramway, creates an unequivocal identity.

In her activity as an architect and urbanist, Elizabeth de Portzamparc plans her buildings as architectural symbols, carriers of new values, strong urban landmarks that structure and inhabit perfectly the places where they are installed. Open to the city and to its inhabitants, her projects of the Musée de la Romanité de Nîmes, the Grand Documentary Equipment of the Condorcet Campus in Aubervilliers and the Le Bourget railway station of Le Bourget, one of the iconic stations of the Grand Paris, have been thought as places "to live in", which are easily appropriable. Much more than effective equipments, their porous and open architecture, crossed by the interior streets, makes them very open to all. Their atriums are real interior public squares, protected and luminous, creators of collective life, support of local animation and quality of life their users.

Thanks to her double sociological and architectural approach, she combines the imperatives of the social, urban and ecological significance with an optimum realization of the form, a coherent action visible in all aspects of her work. Her projects are characterized by their innovative proposals in terms of flexibility and good space management.

Professional approach 
Her academic and artistic education, combined with her multicultural vision, bring multiple facets and a complex dimension to her works. By means of the application of her reflexions on the identity of cities and metropolis, her projects respect and reinforce the qualities of the context where they are put in.

By fostering the crossing spaces and a strong relationship with nature, they create a special atmosphere, express easily identifiable collective values and initiate a dialogue with the environmental urban landscape and the local culture. Her sober architecture, with light and pure lines, based on the lightering of the masses and on the economy of forms and materials, shows that building in an economic way do not mean banalization or loss of architectural quality.

Flexibility is an ongoing theme in her projects and one of the most important for Elizabeth de Portzamparc, for it allows fighting the obsolescence of buildings, to assure their durability. A project must be capable of evolving throughout time and to adapt to different purposes and programs. As shown by the projects of the GED and the Le Bourget railway stations, by following this principle, she creates "total-flex" buildings, for mixed-use, with open plans and with the possibility of future extension without changing the original concept.

Sustainable development is an ecosystem approach adopted by Elizabeth de Portzamparc at al levels of her work according to the different aspects and needs of each project, whether it concerns territory planning or buildings. She develops bioclimatic projects, energetically autonomous, which become active in this action in every dimension (environmental, economic and social). By recreating the local biodiversity in her projects, she embeds her buildings perfectly to the nature and to each context.

Study and research themes 
In the Atelier International du Grand Paris she pursuits her researches led since 30 years about the identity of the places, the local life and the territorial links, fundamental contributions to the reflexions on the construction of the metropolis. Still in this same context, she made various propositions for sustainable, flexible, mixed-use and prefab housing, with controlled cost and fast to build. These models on which Elizabeth de Portzamparc works since 2004 for fast housing of homeless and refugees is a suitable solution for housing the most fragile individuals, humanitarian issue of ever-growing importance. By placing Mankind and Nature in the center of her concerns, through her projects she tries to bring appropriate answers to our civilization's crisis.

Major projects - Architecture and Urbanism

Architecture 
 Oasis bioclimatic tower, Rabat – 230 m high - Contest (2015)
 Anfa hotel, Casablanca - 23 000 sqm - Contest (2015- 2018)
 Grand Documentary Equipment of the Condorcet Campus, Aubervilliers, France - Contest, winning project (2014-2019)
 Le Bourget railway station, France: Line 16 of the parisian metro - Contest, winning project (2014-2022) 
 Musée de la Romanité of Nîmes, France: architecture and museography - Contest, winning project (2012-2017)
 Housing in Versailles-Chantiers, France: construction of housing buildings - Commission (2012- ongoing study)
 Tower of La Noue: High Rise Tower for mixed use in Bagnolet, Île-de-France, France
 4-star hotel tower: mixed-use building for hotel and housing, Casablanca, Maroc (2009-)
 French Cultural Center in Florianopolis (theater, media library, restaurant) for the French Alliance, Brazil - Contest, winning project (2009-)
 Bassins à Flot: buildings for housing in accession to ownership and social housing (with commerces, parking lots - 10,000 sqm) in Bordeaux, France (2009-2016)
 Riocentro exhibition center, Rio de Janeiro, Brazil - Contest, winning project (2007-2014)

Urbanism 
 Restructuration of the neighborhood of Pointe de Trivaux in Meudon-la-Forêt, France – Construction of collective housing, commerces and collective services – Contests (2015)
 Project for the creation of an eco-neighborhood in Châtenay-Malabry, France – Contest (2013-)
 New city center of Massy (Île-de-France), France: construction of housing buildings for mixed-use - Contest, winning project (2011-2017) 
 Tramway of Bordeaux: 145 stations and their urban furniture - Contest, winning project (1997-2013)

Regional and coastal planning 
 Qinhuangdao peninsula, China: Urbanism of the peninsula for a new urban pole in Qinhuangdao: creation of docks and promenades near the shore; housing, commerces, equipments, green areas – Commission (2013- project on hold)
 EuroCalais, France – planning for the littoral zone between Calais and Wissant: restructuration of the nautical base and of the channel linked to Calais; extension of the pond of Saint Roch; housing and diverse equipments – (2011)
 Dolphin's resort, Natal, Brazil – conception of the master plan on an eco-resort; conception and construction of a mobile bridge over the river Santo Alberto – Commission (2009)
 Territorial development of Mahdia's coast, Tunisia – creation of an island, a harbour and coastal urbanism and renovation of attached neighborhoods (2008- projet abandonné)
 Buljarica Coastal Development, Buljarica, Montenegro – Sustainable planning of Buljarica's littoral: creation of a marina, a seaside station, hotels SPA, renovation of the existing village, creation of an autonomous city; creation of an international Environment Researches Center (2007- project on hold)
 Offshore extension in Monaco: conception of an eco-territory on the sea; creation of sea fortifications with 4 km promenade along the seafront; conception of the urbanism and architecture of the harbour, artificial beaches, hotel and housing buildings – Contest (2007- abandoned project)

Museography 
 Musée de la Romanité of Nîmes, France – Contest, winning project (2012-2017)
 Jean Cocteau museum, Menton, France – Contest, winning project (abandoned project)
 Museum of Brittany, Rennes, France – Contest, winning project (1995-2006)
 Nelson Atkins Museum, Kansas City, USA (2002)
 National Museum of Korea, Seoul - Contest, winning project (1992- abandoned project)

Interior design 
 Headquarter of the Banque Fédérale des Banques Populaires Group, Paris, France – Contest, winning project (2003)
 Headquarter of the Journal Le Monde, Paris, France – Commission (2003)
 Les Grandes Marches restaurant, Paris, France – Commission (2000)
 Canal+ Headquarter, Issy-les-Moulineaux, France – Commission (1998)
 French Embassy in Berlin, Germany – Contest, winning project (1996)
 Café de la Musique restaurant, Paris, France – Commande (1994)

Design 
 "Volux" luminaire edited by Radian (2004)
 Urban luminaires "Hestia" and "Moon Torch" edited by Comatelec (2002)
 "Opéra" chair edited by Poltrona Frau (2000)
 "Zache 2" et "Zache 2 osier" armchairs edited by Bonacina (2000)
 "Dune" chairs edited by Quinette Gallay (1999)
 "Jazz" coat hangers (1989), acquired by the Fonds National d’Art Contemporain
 "24 hours" desk (1988), acquired by the Fonds National d’Art Contemporain

Operational research (4 phases) 
 Revolution Precrafted Home: Home Pavilion project, prefabricated houses designed by renown architects, designers and artists (2015)
 Exhibition Casa Cidade Mundo in Rio de Janeiro, Brazil: sketches of the concept of prefabricated houses that respect the nature and the identity of the cities (2015)
 Study for prefabricated housing for the Grand Paris (2012/2013)
 Project of prefabricated housing for the State of Santa Catarina, Brazil (2009)

Nominations and distinctions 
 2016 - The Musée de la Romanité of Nîmes wins the "Future Heritage Award" in Dubrovnik, Croacia
 2014 - Medal from the French Senate for her work
 Since 2012 - Member of the Scientific Council of the Atelier International du Grand Paris
 2005 - Mipim design award for the rehabilitation of the Journal Le Monde, Cannes
 2002 - "Lighting Design Award" for the urban luminaire HESTIA, London
 2002 - International Prize, category "hotels" for the Brasserie "Les Grandes Marches", Contract World Award, Hanover
 1999 - International Prize for Interior Design and Architecture, Fondation Candido Mendes, bestowed by Sergio Bernardes, Rio de Janeiro

Main events 
 4th Biennial of Architecture and Urbanism of Caen, (Re)Construire la ville sur-mesure: lecture on the theme "Fabriquer un tissu urbain contemporain", October 8, 2016
 Symposium (Re)Créer le monde: lecture on the theme "Architecture et visions du monde: la renaissance de l'architecture et de notre civilisation?", May 20, 2016 at the Philharmonie de Paris
 Participation in the exhibition "Les passagers du Grand Paris Express", from March 11 to May 22, 2016, in Boulogne-Billancourt
 Participation in the exhibition Casa Cidade Mundo, from October 3 to November 14, 2015, in Rio de Janeiro
 Conference in the Rio Academy International Forum on the theme "Urbanisme et mobilité", July 21, 2015 in Rio de Janeiro
 Conference in the Centre Pierres Vives on the theme "Identité urbaine: le local et le global", February 6, 2014 in Montpellier
 Participation in the roundtable on the theme "Architecture & Cinéma" in the 2nd edition of the Festival Cinecoa, September 29, 2012, in Vila Nova de Foz Côa, Portugal
 Participation in the exhibition "MDF, des créateurs pour un matériau", from April 24 to May 22, 1988, at the Fondation Cartier for Contemporary Art, Paris

Main publications 
 Participation in the catalogue of the Biennial of Architecture and Urbanism of Caen, 2016
 Participation in the catalogue of the exhibition "Une brève histoire de l’avenir" in the Louvre Museum, from September 24, 2015, to January 4, 2016
 Participation in the book "Cher Corbu…", tribute to Le Corbusier at the time of the 50th anniversary of his death, January 2015
 Participation in the number 3 of the magazine Stream on the theme "Issues of the local in the age of global urbanisation", November 2014
 Participation to the special édition of the magazine L’Architecture Aujourd’hui in tribute tu Oscar Niemeyer – Paroles d’Architectes (page 23), 2013
 Book about the Museum of Brittany (museography), 2006
 Research for the Ministry of Environment and Quality of life: "Extension of the local democracy, new social actors and information strategies", 1982
 Implementation of the study "The neighborhoods of Antony: urban and socio-economic analysis and diagnose of the city", 1980
 Implementation of the "Reference plan of Antony" with Georges Douarre: proposition of urban plannings (traffic plans, urban equipments and housing), 1980
 Research for the Public Institution of the New City of Saint-Quentin en Yvelines: the neighborhood of Elancourt-Maurepas. From the urban planner's new city to the city of the inhabitants. With Marie-Odile Terrenoire, 1975

References

External links 

Musée de la Romanité à Nîmes

Living people
Year of birth missing (living people)
20th-century French architects
21st-century French architects
Brazilian architects
Brazilian expatriates in France
 
Brazilian women architects
French people of Breton descent
People from Rio de Janeiro (city)
20th-century French women
21st-century French women